The Leica M10 Monochrom is a digital rangefinder camera manufactured by Leica Camera. It was released on 17 January 2020. A black and white only successor to the Leica M Monochrom and the Leica M Monochrom (Typ 246). The M10 Monochrom uses a full frame 40 Megapixels CMOS sensor that has no color filter on the sensor. The Leica M10 Monochrom is physically similar to the Leica M10 and Leica M10-P with a dedicated ISO dial on the top plate. The ISO ranges from 160 to 100,000. The M10 Monochrom has a 3" color TFT LCD monitor with 1,036,800 pixels covered with Gorilla Glass. The camera is made of all-metal die cast magnesium body, wrapped in synthetic leather covering, and brass top panel and base, with black chrome plated finish.

References

External links

 

M10 Monochrom
Digital rangefinder cameras
Cameras introduced in 2020